Lac Sainte-Anne du Nord (English: Sainte Anne lake of the North) is a body of fresh water located in Grands-Jardins National Park, northeast of the city of Quebec, in the unorganized territory of Lac-Pikauba, in the Charlevoix, in the administrative region of Capitale-Nationale, in the province of Quebec, in Canada. The current of the Sainte-Anne River crosses this lake to the southwest over its full length.

The hydrographic side of Lac Sainte-Anne du Nord is served by a secondary forest road linked to the north at route 381, for forestry purposes. Forestry is the main economic activity in this valley; recreational tourism, second.

Because of the altitude, the surface of Lac Sainte-Anne du Nord is generally frozen from the end of November to the beginning of April; however, safe circulation on the ice is generally done from the beginning of December until the beginning of April.

Geography 
Its mouth is located at:
  east of Lac Carré, the outlet of which meets north the south bank of the Petite rivière Malbaie;
  south-est of a curve of Malbaie River;
  north of the confluence of the Sainte-Anne River and the Saint Lawrence River;
  northwest of downtown Baie-Saint-Paul.

This lake is mainly fed by the outlet (coming from the north) of the Sainte-Anne river and by the outlet (coming from the east) of Lac Grâce.

From the dam at the mouth of Lake Sainte-Anne du Nord, the current descends on  first to the southwest, south, then southwest, in following the course of the Sainte-Anne river, which crosses downtown Beaupré, to the northwest shore of the Saint-Laurent river.

Toponymy 
This toponymic designation appears on regional map number 3-East, section 23 NW, from 1943 and on the draft of the map of Saint-Urbain, 1958-12-17, item 73. The origin of the name of Lac Sainte-Anne du Nord comes from that of the river which was originally called Rivière Sainte-Anne du Nord. This toponymic designation was approved on April 3, 1959, by the Commission de géographie du Québec. In 1982, the name was changed to Rivière Sainte-Anne to reflect popular usage which omitted the cardinal point. Grand lac Sainte-Anne, Grand lac Sainte-Anne du Nord, Lac Sainte-Anne and Rivière Sainte-Anne du Nord are the variants of this official name.

The toponym "Lac Sainte-Anne du Nord" was formalized on December 5, 1968, at the Place Names Bank of the Commission de toponymie du Québec.

See also 
 St. Lawrence River

References 

Lakes of Capitale-Nationale
Charlevoix Regional County Municipality